Reid Robinson (born June 7, 1908) was an American labor unionist.

Born in Butte, Montana, Robinson moved with his family to Calgary in 1914, then to Seattle in 1918, and back to Butte in 1921.  After school, he worked in the copper mines.  He joined the International Union of Mine, Mill and Smelter Workers, of which his father had become secretary-treasurer.

Robinson devoted much of his time to the union, and built the Butte Miner's No. 1 local into the most important in the entire organization.  He became its financial secretary and then, in 1935, won election as president of the international union.  He was also elected as a vice-president of the Congress of Industrial Organizations.

Under Robinson's leadership, the union's membership increased from 20,000 to more than 90,000.  He recruited large numbers of organizers, some of whom were communists.  This alienated many of his former supporters, who were on the right wing of the union.  He was re-elected in 1946, but resigned in 1947 as he lost the support of the union's executive.

In 1947, Robinson was elected as the union's eastern vice-president, in which role he focused on organizing Canadian miners, while also backing Henry A. Wallace's campaign in the 1948 United States presidential election.  Despite not himself being a communist, he was deported from Canada as a communist agitator, and in 1950 he resigned his union positions.  He moved back to Butte, then to California, where he worked in various manual jobs.

References

1908 births
Year of death missing
American trade union leaders
People from Butte, Montana
Trade unionists from Montana
People deported from Canada
Congress of Industrial Organizations people
International Union of Mine, Mill and Smelter Workers people